Ivanhoe was a 1997 American/British television mini-series based on the 1819 novel Ivanhoe by Sir Walter Scott. It was produced by the BBC and A&E Network and consisted of six 50 minute episodes.

Plot 
This adaptation of Sir Walter Scott's novel is set in 1192 AD and depicts a disinherited knight who is accused of treachery. He returns anonymously to his home in England, to clear his name and win his lady love. King Richard had been a prisoner in an Austrian dungeon, but is now returning to an England ruled by Prince John. The production claims realism, mainly through a depiction of a very rough and poverty stricken time; the producers claim this is in contrast to earlier, "sanitized" versions. People wear layers of often old, sometimes ragged clothing to keep the cold out, are sometimes dirty, and have long shaggy hair and beards.

TV episodes

Episode 1:
The knight and crusader Ivanhoe is released from an Austrian prison after refusing to betray King Richard. He returns to England, where it is rumored that he did betray the King. Ivanhoe must clear his name and save his beloved Rowena from a loveless marriage to Prince Athelstane. Disguised as a pilgrim, he comes to the aid of a stranger, Isaac of York, who offers Ivanhoe a chance to compete in Prince John's tournament.

Episode 2:
At the tournament, Ivanhoe defeats the Norman knights and earns the enmity of Prince John. In the second day of tournament, the Prince champions a group of his Norman henchmen, including the former crusader Bois-Guilbert, against Ivanhoe and the Saxons. Ivanhoe is joined by the mysterious Black Knight, and Bois-Guilbert and the Normans are defeated.

Episode 3:
Wounded in the tournament against the Normans, Ivanhoe is tended to by the beautiful healer Rebecca, daughter of Isaac of York. Meanwhile, Bois-Guilbert schemes to steal Rowena for one of his cohorts. Disguised as outlaws, the Normans storm the Saxon camp, kidnapping Rowena, Ivanhoe, his father, Rebecca and Isaac.

Episode 4:
Robin Hood and his allies, along with the Black Knight, prepare to attack the castle where Ivanhoe and his companions are held. Inside, Rebecca and Ivanhoe discover their love for one another. When the castle is stormed, the Saxons save Rowena from Bois-Guilbert. He then kidnaps Rebecca, whom he secretly loves, and they flee as the castle burns.

Episode 5:
An attempt is made on the Black Knight's life, and he reveals himself as King Richard to his outlaw comrades. Meanwhile, John sentences Rebecca to burn as a witch, and her only chance for survival is to demand a trial by combat. Bois-Guilbert will act as the court's champion—but who will defend the honor of Rebecca?

Episode 6:
King Richard assures his supporters that Ivanhoe never betrayed him, clearing the way for Ivanhoe's marriage to Rowena. Ivanhoe then learns of Rebecca's fate, and a devastated Rowena begs him not to ride to her defense. But Ivanhoe will not miss the chance to fight Bois-Guilbert—and finally right old wrongs.

Cast
 Steven Waddington as Ivanhoe
 Ciaran Madden as Urfried
 Ciarán Hinds as Bois Guilbert
 Susan Lynch as Rebecca
 Jimmy Chisholm as Wamba
 Nick Brimble as Front de Boeuf
 Valentine Pelka as Maurice de Bracy
 David Nicholls as Little John
 James Cosmo as Cedric
 Chris Walker as Athelstane
 Simon Donald as Louis Winklebrand
Roger Ashton-Griffiths as Prior Aymer
 Dermot Keaney as Brother Ambrose
 Trevor Cooper as Gurth
 Ron Donachie as Friar Tuck
 Aden Gillett as Robin of Locksley
 David Horovitch as Isaac
 Rory Edwards as King Richard
 Victoria Smurfit as Rowena
 Peter Guinness as Montfitchet
 Christopher Lee as Beaumanoir
 Jack Klaff as Malvoisin
 Peter Needham as Abbot
 David Barrass as Hubert
 Renny Krupinski as Bardon
 Ralph Brown as Prince John
 Ronald Pickup as Fitzurse
 Siân Phillips as Eleanor of Aquitaine

Experts behind the series

 Stunt Coordinator: Gareth Milne
 Horse Master: Steve Dent
 Sword Master: Nick Powell
 Stunt Performers: Joss Gower, Nick Hobbs, Nrinder Dhudwar, Tom Lucy
 Historical Advisor: Christopher Gravett
 Judaica Advisor: Lewis Glinert
 Armourer: Rob Partridge

Production
Parts of the series were shot at Doune Castle, Hermitage Castle in the Scottish Borders and at Craigmillar Castle and Blackness Castle near Edinburgh.

Home media
The series was released on a set of 6 VHS tapes and also on a 2 DVD set.

See also
List of historical drama films

References

External links
 

BBC television dramas
1990s British television miniseries
Television shows based on Ivanhoe
Fiction set in the 1190s
Television series set in the 12th century
1997 British television series debuts
1997 British television series endings
1990s British drama television series
British adventure television series
Television series produced at Pinewood Studios
English-language television shows
Films shot in Edinburgh
Films shot in the Scottish Borders